The 1904 Calgary municipal election was held on December 12, 1904, to elect a Mayor and nine Aldermen to sit on the twenty-first Calgary City Council from January 2, 1905, to January 2, 1906.

Nominations closed on December 5, 1904. Incumbent Mayor Silas Alexander Ramsay did not contest the election and instead contested an Aldermanic position in Ward 1. This resulted in incumbent Ward 1 Aldermen John Emerson defeating his opponents and incumbent Aldermen William Henry Cushing and James Abel Hornby to become the 15th Mayor of Calgary.

Background
The election was held under multiple non-transferable vote where each elector was able to cast a ballot for the mayor and up to three ballots for separate councillors within a voter's designated ward.

Results

Mayor

Councillors

Ward 1

Ward 2

Public School Board
Nominations included:
Alexander Allan
Robert John Hutchings
Arthur Leslie Cameron
James Short
Edward Henry Crandell
Thomas Underwood

Ward 3

By-election
William Leigh Bernard declined the office of Aldermen and his seat was declared unclaimed on January 2, 1905. James Abel Hornby was elected in by-election as Aldermen for Ward 1 on January 18, 1905.

See also
List of Calgary municipal elections

References

Municipal elections in Calgary
1904 elections in Canada
1900s in Calgary